All In One  is the fifth solo album by multiple Grammy and Stellar award-winning gospel singer Karen Clark Sheard, released on April 6, 2010. The album debuted at #3 on the U.S. Billboard Gospel Albums chart and #98 on the U.S. Billboard Top 200 albums chart and was the first album to be released on her own music label, Karew Records.

The album's lead single - "Prayed Up" - peaked at #9 on the U.S. Billboard Gospel Songs chart and spent over 32 weeks on the chart.
The album's Second Single He Knows (feat. Dorinda Clark- Cole) has currently peaked at #15 on the U.S. Billboard Gospel Songs chart. The album sold moderately well but still did not match its predecessor Finally Karen, which is Sheard's largest selling album to date. However, All in One received positive reviews from critics and gathered Grammy, Stellar, Dove, and BET Award nominations and remained a top seller on Billboard's Gospel Charts.

Track listing 
Unless otherwise indicated, Information is taken from Liner Notes and Discogs.com
 Prayed Up (Karen Clark Sheard, J. Drew Sheard II) - 3:51 *Produced by J. Drew Sheard II*Vocals arranged by Karen Clark Sheard & J. Drew Sheard II*Lead & Background Vocals performed by Karen Clark Sheard*Intro Voices & All Other Instruments performed by J Drew Sheard II*Bass Guitar: Thaddeus "Terry" Tribbett*Horns arranged & Saxophone played by DeShawn Jones*Trumpet: Kris Johnson
 Hold On (J. Drew Sheard II, Karen Clark Sheard, Angel Chisholm) - 3:46 *Produced by J. Drew Sheard II*Vocals arranged by Karen Clark Sheard & J. Drew Sheard II*Lead Vocals performed by Kierra Sheard & Karen Clark Sheard*Additional Background Vocals performed by J. Drew Sheard II & Karen Clark Sheard*Bass Guitar: Ronald "CJ" Alexander*Horns arranged & Saxophone played by DeShawn Jones*Trumpet: Kris Johnson*All Other Instruments played by J. Drew Sheard II*Contains a Vocal Sample from "Hip Hop Hooray" performed by Naughty by Nature
 Blessings (Karen Clark Sheard, Charles Woolfork, J. Drew Sheard II) - 3:38 *Produced by J. Drew Sheard II*Lead & Background Vocals: Karen Clark Sheard*Background Vocals: J. Drew Sheard II*Piano: Justin Brooks*Horns arranged & Saxophone played by DeShawn Jones*Trumpet: Kris Johnson*All Other Instruments played by Josh Davis & J. Drew Sheard II
 I Made A Choice (J. Moss) - 4:08 *Produced by PAJAM: Paul "PDA" Allen, J. Moss & Walter Kearney*Lead & Background Vocals: Karen Clark Sheard*Background Vocals: J. Moss*All Instruments (played by): PAJAM: Paul "PDA" Allen & J. Moss
 Lord Take Me (featuring Kierra Sheard & Angel Chisholm) (J. Drew Sheard II, Angel Chisholm) - 4:41 *Produced by J. Drew Sheard II*Vocals arranged & All Other Instruments played by J. Drew Sheard II*Lead Vocals performed by Angel Chisholm, Karen Clark Sheard & Kierra Sheard*Background Vocals performed by Angel Chisholm, Karen Clark Sheard & J. Drew Sheard II*Acoustic Guitar: Tom Stoepker
 Good (J. Moss) - 4:34 *Produced by PAJAM: Paul "PDA" Allen, J. Moss & Walter Kearney*Lead & Background Vocals: Karen Clark Sheard*Background Vocals: J. Moss*All Instruments: PAJAM: Paul "PDA" Allen & J. Moss
 Because Of You (J. Moss) - 5:00 *Produced by PAJAM: Paul "PDA" Allen, J. Moss & Walter Kearney*Lead & Background Vocals: Karen Clark Sheard*Background Vocals: J. Moss*All Instruments: PAJAM: Paul "PDA" Allen & J. Moss
 Crazy Praise (Karen Clark Sheard, J. Drew Sheard II, Angel Chisholm) - 3:43 *Produced by J. Drew Sheard II*Vocals arranged by Karen Clark Sheard*Lead & Background Vocals performed by Karen Clark Sheard*Background Vocals & All Other Instruments: J. Drew Sheard II*Bass Guitar: Ronald "CJ" Alexander*Horns arranged & Saxophone played by DeShawn Jones*Trumpet: Kris Johnson
 What He Did (Karen Clark Sheard, J. Moss) - 4:30 *Produced by PAJAM: Paul "PDA" Allen, J. Moss & Walter Kearney*Lead & Background Vocals: Karen Clark Sheard*Background Vocals: J. Moss*All Instruments: PAJAM: Paul "PDA" Allen & J. Moss
 He Knows (featuring Dorinda Clark-Cole) (J. Moss, Paul D. Allen) - 4:12 *Produced by PAJAM: Paul "PDA" Allen, J. Moss & Walter Kearney*Lead Vocals: Dorinda Clark-Cole & Karen Clark Sheard*Background Vocals: Karen Clark Sheard & J. Moss*Talking Voices (Intro): J. Moss*Instruments (played & sampled by): PAJAM: Paul "PDA" Allen & J. Moss
 Have Your Way (Charles Woolfork, J. Drew Sheard II) - 4:35 *Produced by J. Drew Sheard II*Talking Voices: Karen Clark Sheard*Background Vocals: Kierra Sheard & John Smith*Acoustic Guitar: Tom Stoepker*Piano: Anthony Taylor*Additional Keyboards: Josh Davis*Additional Instruments played by J. Drew Sheard II
 All For One (Bonus Track) - 3:55 *Produced by PAJAM: Paul "PDA" Allen, J. Moss & Walter Kearney*Background Vocals: J. Moss*Instruments: PAJAM: Paul "PDA" Allen & J. Moss

Charts

References

External links 
 
 

Karen Clark Sheard albums
2010 albums